Augocoris is a genus of shield-backed bugs in the family Scutelleridae. There are at least two described species in Augocoris.

Species
These two species belong to the genus Augocoris:
 Augocoris gomesii Burmeister, 1835
 Augocoris illustris (Fabricius, 1781)

References

Further reading

 
 
 

Scutelleridae
Articles created by Qbugbot